Gobernador Gregores Airport , is an airport serving Gobernador Gregores, a town in the Santa Cruz Province of Argentina.

The Gobernador Gregores non-directional beacon (Ident: GRE) is located on the field.

Airlines and destinations
No scheduled flights operate at this airport.

See also

Transport in Argentina
List of airports in Argentina

References

External links
OpenStreetMap - Gobernador Gregores Airport

Airports in Argentina